The 2005 South American Youth Championship (Sudamericana sub-20) was a football competition contested by all ten U-20 national football teams of CONMEBOL. The tournament was held in Colombia between 13 January and 6 February 2005, it was the 22nd time the competition has been held and the third to take place in Colombia. Colombia finished undefeated, winning their second trophy.

Format
The teams are separated in two groups of five, and each team plays four matches in a pure round-robin stage. The three top competitors advance to a single final group of six, wherein each team plays five matches. The top four teams in the final group qualify to the 2005 FIFA World Youth Championship

Squads
For a list of all the squads in the final tournament, see 2005 South American Youth Championship squads.

The following teams entered the tournament:

 
 
 
 
  (host)

First group stage

Group A

Results

Group B

Results

Final group

Results

Winners

Qualifiers for 2005 FIFA World Youth Championship

Top scorers

11 goals
 Hugo Rodallega
5 goals
 Lionel Messi
 Nicolás Canales
4 goals
 Evandro
 Matías Fernández
 Cristian Rodríguez
 Juan Albín
 Paul Ramírez
3 goals
 Pablo Barrientos
 Rafael Sóbis
 Thiago Quirino
 Juan Lorca
 Sebastián Montecinos
 José Pedro Fuenzalida
 Cristian Bogado

2 goals
 Juan Manuel Torres
 Nelson Sossa
 Fernandinho
 Filipe Luís
 Renato Ribeiro
 Abel Aguilar
 Cristian Marrugo
 Juan Carlos Toja
 Wason Rentería
 Antonio Valencia
 Carlos Javier Acuña
 Leandro Ezquerra
 Miku
 Ronald Vargas

External links
 2005 Sulamericano Sub-20 at RSSSF
  Official statistics
 Official page at Conmebol website

Youth Championship
2005 in Colombian football
South American Youth Championship
International association football competitions hosted by Colombia
2005 in youth association football